Janhonen is a Finnish surname. Notable people with the surname include:

Pauli Janhonen (1914–2007), Finnish sport shooter
 (1886–1939), Finnish politician, minister in Kallio IV Cabinet
Hilja Haapala (born Janhonen; 1877–1858), Finnish writer

See also
Janhunen

Finnish-language surnames